Parallel Flaming is an album by Djen Ajakan Shean and Vidna Obmana, released in 1994 through Multimood.

Track listing

Personnel 
Kris Cleerbaut – photography
Vidna Obmana – tape, udu, shaker, maracas, rainstick, tubular bells, didgeridoo, arrangement
Djen Ajakan Shean – drum machine, flute, percussion, arrangement

References 

1994 albums
Vidna Obmana albums